Streptomyces pactum is a bacterium species from the genus of Streptomyces. Streptomyces pactum produces pactamycin, actinopyrones, and piericidins.

See also 
 List of Streptomyces species

References

Further reading

External links
Type strain of Streptomyces pactum at BacDive -  the Bacterial Diversity Metadatabase	

pactum
Bacteria described in 1962